Eusynthemis ursula is a species of dragonfly of the family Synthemistidae,
known as the Beech tigertail. 
It is a slender, medium-sized dragonfly with black and yellow markings.
It has been found near the source of small streams at altitude in the vicinity of Barrington Tops, New South Wales, Australia

Eusynthemis ursula appears similar to Eusynthemis ursa which is also found at altitude in a similar vicinity in Australia.

Gallery

See also
 List of Odonata species of Australia

References

Synthemistidae
Odonata of Australia
Insects of Australia
Endemic fauna of Australia
Taxa named by Günther Theischinger
Insects described in 1998